Meggenhofen is a municipality in the district of Grieskirchen in the Austrian state of Upper Austria.

Geography
Meggenhofen lies in the Hausruckviertel. About 14 percent of the municipality is forest, and 76 percent is farmland.

References

Cities and towns in Grieskirchen District